The 2015–16 West Midlands (Regional) League season was the 116th in the history of the West Midlands (Regional) League, an English association football competition for semi-professional and amateur teams based in the West Midlands county, Shropshire, Herefordshire, Worcestershire and southern Staffordshire. It has three divisions, the highest of which is the Premier Division, which sits at step 6 of the National League System, or the tenth level of the overall English football league system.

Premier Division

The Premier Division featured 19 clubs which competed in the division last season, along with three new clubs:
Bromyard Town, promoted from Division One
Stone Old Alleynians, promoted from Division One
Tipton Town, relegated from the Midland League

League table

Results

References

External links
  at non-league.org
 West Midlands (Regional) League at Pitchero.com

2015-16
10